NGC 4467 is an elliptical galaxy located about 78 million light-years away in the constellation of Virgo. NGC 4467 was discovered by astronomer Otto Struve on April 28, 1851. NGC 4467 is a companion of Messier 49 and is a member of the Virgo Cluster.

See also 
 List of NGC objects (4001–5000)
 NGC 4464

References

External links

Elliptical galaxies
Virgo (constellation)
4467
41169
Astronomical objects discovered in 1851
Virgo Cluster